Frederick Spencer may refer to:

 Frederick Spencer, 4th Earl Spencer, British naval commander, courtier, and Whig politician
 Frederick Randolph Spencer, American portrait painter
 Fred Spencer (footballer), English footballer
 Freddie Spencer, American motorcycle racer

See also 
 Fred Spencer, American animator